The Underwater Offence, or SAT, is the special operations forces unit of the Turkish Navy, and the first and only navy commando unit consisting of highly skilled soldiers selected from among the officers and petty officers of the Turkish Navy. They are affiliated with the Naval Operation Directorate.
During war, the unit is responsible for  stealthy attack, sabotage and raids on the coastal strategic facilities of the enemy whether under water, over water, land or air, to their floating platforms. The SAT participates in coastal reconnaissance to be subtracted under the pre-force operation and underwater control of the coast and the control of foreign ports.

History
The first S.A.T. course was conducted in 1962 in the city of Iskenderun, with its first trainees graduating in 1963.  The original name of the S.A.T. unit was Su Altı Komando (S.A.K.) ("Underwater Commando") and was bound to the Kurtarma ve Sualtı Komutanlığı (K.S.K.), or Rescue and Underwater Command. 

In 1974 S.A.T. group command became bound to the Turkish Navy's General Command, and participated in the Turkish military landing in Cyprus later that year. They conducted the beach reconnaissance mission prior to the amphibious landing of the Turkish Armed Forces at Pentamili beach near Kyrnia (20 July 1974). Other publicised operations of S.A.T. commandos are as follows: 

 S.A.T commandos, which came to the public agenda for the first time after a Turkish cargo ship named Figen Akat landed on the Kardak cliffs on December 25, 1995, successfully infiltrated the Kardak Rocks among Greek OYK Commandos on January 31, 1996.
 In 2012, they participated in Operation Ocean Shield, organized by NATO against sea rogue and rescued 7 Yemeni seafarers.

Mission
The SAT's main tasks are:

 Surveillance on enemy structures, facilities, defense systems or strategically relevant buildings.
 Covert sabotage against naval units and/or enemy structures.
 Covert landing and infiltration.
 Reconnaissance on behind-the-beaches being considered for amphibious landing operations.
 Determining secure landing paths.
 Direct action during first wave of landing missions.
 Counter-terrorism missions.
 Close quarters combat.

Training
In order to have a SAT Specialization, it is necessary to successfully complete the 50-week SAT (Marine Commando) specialized course. The first phase starts with 8 weeks of physical and fitness development. After these trainings, the trainee who passes the physical and physical exams at sea and land progress to the underwater phase and is taken to the frog-man training for 8 weeks. After these phases are successfully completed, the land phase begins. In the land phase, it is called hell week after training on gaining a high level of land condition, swimming long distances in the water and getting on the boat, VBSS , performing the task under pressure, getting rid of captivity, sea threats and long distance in the land, finding targets. After intensive training, the land phase is completed. With these trainings, they have the skills to sneak, sabotage and raid the enemy's coastal and floating targets. Then, trainings using mostly tactical floating platforms and aircraft are taken. They train about 15 hours a day.

Equipment
Underwater Offence Command's equipment includes:

Handguns
 SIG P226
 Glock

Submachine Guns
 CZ Scorpion Evo 3
 H&K MP5A3

Assault Rifles
 M4 carbine

Machine Guns
 FN Minimi 5.56 x 45 (Mk46)
 FN Minimi 7.62 x 51 (Mk48)
 M60 machine gun
 M134

Sniper Rifles
 Barrett M82A1
 Barrett M95
 MKEK JNG-90
 Remington XM2010
 CheyTac Intervention
 McMillan TAC-50

Rockets & Explosives
 AirTronic PSRL-1
 RPG-7
 M72 LAW
 M79
 M203 grenade launcher

Gallery

References

External links
Promotional/Training video of unit

Turkish Naval Forces
Special forces of Turkey
Armed forces diving